Bembidion quadrimaculatum is a species of ground beetle of the family Carabidae. It is found in Europe and Northern Asia (excluding China), North America, and Southern Asia.

Subspecies
These six subspecies belong to the species Bembidion quadrimaculatum:
 Bembidion quadrimaculatum caporiaccoi Netolitzky, 1935 c g
 Bembidion quadrimaculatum cardiaderum Solsky, 1874 c g
 Bembidion quadrimaculatum dubitans (LeConte, 1852) i c g b
 Bembidion quadrimaculatum mandli Netolitzky, 1932 c g
 Bembidion quadrimaculatum oppositum Say, 1823 i c g b
 Bembidion quadrimaculatum quadrimaculatum (Linnaeus, 1761) i c g
Data sources: i = ITIS, c = Catalogue of Life, g = GBIF, b = Bugguide.net

References

Further reading

External links

 

quadrimaculatum
Articles created by Qbugbot
Beetles described in 1761
Taxa named by Carl Linnaeus